George Butterfield (1879 – 24 September 1917) was a British athlete running for Darlington Harriers. He ran the world's fastest mile in 1906, and competed at the 1908 Summer Olympics in London.

Born in Stockton on Tees, Butterfield came in second in his semifinal heat in the 800 metres with a time of 1:58.9.  His finish, while behind Ödön Bodor's, was ahead of defending champion James Lightbody's. Butterfield did not advance to the final.

He also competed in the 1500 metres, placing third in his initial semifinal heat and not advancing to the final. Butterfield's time was 4:11.8; Mel Sheppard had set a new Olympic record at 4:05.0 in winning the heat and eliminating Butterfield and the other five runners.

Butterfield was killed in action during the First World War, serving as a private with the Royal Garrison Artillery. He was buried in the Birr Cross Roads Cemetery.

His obituary in the Northern Despatch recorded that he had once raced against a greyhound. The dog came second.

See also
 List of Olympians killed in World War I

References

External links
 
 
 

1879 births
1917 deaths
Military personnel from County Durham
Burials in France
Burials in Belgium
Athletes (track and field) at the 1908 Summer Olympics
Olympic athletes of Great Britain
Durham Light Infantry soldiers
British military personnel killed in World War I
Sportspeople from Darlington
English male middle-distance runners
Sportspeople from Stockton-on-Tees
Athletes from Yorkshire
Royal Garrison Artillery soldiers
British Army personnel of World War I